Bryni, Ealdorman of Sussex, issued an undated charter (but before about 705) as Bruny dux Suthsax’, that was witnessed by Kings Noðhelm and Watt.

Brinfast Farm near Sidlesham on the Manhood Peninsula, means Bryni's fortress.  It is not known whether this refers to the same Bryni of Sussex.

External links

Charter S 1173

References

Anglo-Saxon ealdormen
8th-century rulers in Europe
8th-century English people
Year of death unknown
Year of birth unknown